The Commercial (First) functional constituency is a functional constituency in the elections for the Legislative Council of Hong Kong first created in 1985. The constituency is composed of corporate members of the Hong Kong General Chamber of Commerce (HKGCC) that are entitled to vote at general meetings of the Chamber.

It is one of the oldest functional constituencies created for the first elections to the Legislative Council in 1985. Prior to that, the Chamber had its representatives in the council thoroughly through elections at the general meetings since 1884. It corresponds to the Commercial (First) Subsector in the Election Committee.

History
The Commercial (First) functional constituency was established as First Commercial, one of the two commercial electoral divisions elected by the chambers of commerce. It was one of the original 12 functional constituency seats created for the 1985 Legislative Council election, the first ever election for the colonial legislature. It was composed of bodies that are members of the Hong Kong General Chamber of Commerce (HKGCC) entitled to vote at general meetings of the chamber. Prior to that, the Chamber had its representatives in the council thoroughly through elections at the general meetings since 1884. The representatives are listed as following:

Since its creation, it has been held by pro-business conservatives for the exception of former government official Jimmy McGregor, a liberal-leaning representative who defeated Veronica Wu of the conservative bloc Group of 88 in the 1988 Legislative Council election and held the office from 1988 to 1995. He co-founded the pro-democracy professional-oriented Hong Kong Democratic Foundation (HKDF) and was an ally of the last governor Chris Patten over the controversial constitutional reform proposal.

From 1998 to 2004, the seat was held by pro-business Liberal Party chairman and Executive Councillor James Tien until he contested in the direct election in the 2004 Legislative Council election. Tien's successor Jeffrey Lam who has held the seat since 2004 abruptly quit the Liberal Party in 2008 in the intra-party split. He became representative for the Business and Professionals Alliance for Hong Kong (BPA) and has become member of the Executive Council.

Return members

Electoral results

2020s

2010s

2000s

1990s

1980s

References

Constituencies of Hong Kong
Constituencies of Hong Kong Legislative Council
Functional constituencies (Hong Kong)
1985 establishments in Hong Kong
Constituencies established in 1985